The architecture of Puerto Rico demonstrates a broad variety of architectural styles and built forms over the country's history of over four centuries of former Spanish rule, and over a century of American rule. Puerto Rico's architecture is as diverse as its multicultural society and has been shaped by many internal and external factors and regional distinctions.

Indigenous architecture
When the Spanish first arrived in Puerto Rico, they noted that the native Taino’s architectural structures were susceptible to decay.  Subsequently (among other aspects of their society), Tainos were viewed as naive and inferior, and Spanish depictions of their structures tended to give them a more Neoclassical look (which was the basis of European architecture).
Taino villages (yucayeques) were arranged with huts (bohíos) and family homes (caneyes) in a circular fashion around a courtyard (batey).  Although the Spanish used stone building and functional room division within their structures, they also mimicked Taino techniques and styles using wooden posts, walls, and roofs.

Colonial architecture

European influence became prominent as Spain’s colonial power strengthened in the island.  The island climate as well as military strategy were both taken heavily into account when building structures.  In order to keep buildings safe, they were built within the confines of strong stone outer walls, and in order to fit all these buildings of various religious, military, and administrative functions, colonial buildings tended to be narrowly built.  Courtyards within the structures were utilized for ventilation and lighting purposes. Colonial architecture in Puerto Rico takes substantial inspiration from the architecture of Andalusia, Spain, as many Spanish settlers on the island came from that region.

Military architecture

Fort San Cristóbal
A notable feature of historic Old San Juan architecture, Fort San Cristóbal is a bastion fortress with heavy Vauban influence that has been used to defend San Juan during Spanish and United States occupation.

El Morro
Until the 17th century, El Morro castle was constructed in a medieval style, however, in order to improve its defenses against cannon attacks, Italian engineers Juan Bautista Antonelli and Bautista Antonelli revamped the exterior.

La Fortaleza
Built in 1533, this World Heritage Site was used as a defense against the Carib tribe, and has housed the island’s governors.  Two small, circular towers around a medieval fortress was the original layout of the structure, though in time it came to bear 19th century facades and a neoclassical style.  During its restoration, native-grown ausubo (ironwood) beams were a primary material.

Moorish architecture

Parque de Bombas
Designed by Lieutenant Colonel Maximo Meana, it became Ponce’s official firehouse in 1885 and has since been converted into a museum.  It is notable for its starkly-striped exterior, and the two-tower structure is reflective of Moorish and Gothic influence.

Gothic architecture

San José Church
The one true Gothic structure within the United States' territory (and one of few examples found in the Western Hemisphere), with high ceilings and vaulted arches being the interior’s primary motif.

Spanish Colonial Revival/Art Modern

Jose V. Toledo Federal Building and U.S. Courthouse
Built on a site previously occupied by a Spanish bastion, this structure was built after the United States occupation of Puerto Rico and was overseen by architects James Knox Taylor and Louis A. Simon, with one building opening in 1914 and the other in 1940, the latter being connected to the former via the south facade.  The former is a three-story building sporting a Spanish tile roof, two loggias, and white marble staircases, and was built in a Spanish colonial revival style, while the latter was an Art Modern building with two towers bearing bronze lanterns and six stories, with a more simple, clean aesthetic than the Federal Building.

Baroque architecture

Yagüez Theater
It was constructed in 1909 Mayaguez by Francisco Maymom Palmer in order to show his silent films.  It was reopened in 1919 with new Baroque features under the supervision of architect Sabàs Honoré, and became a historical landmark in 1976.

San Juan Cathedral
Though the vaulted tower and several rooms in the church reflect medieval architecture, San Juan Cathedral boasts the elaborate stylings of Spanish baroque throughout its structure.  Juan Ponce de Leon is interred in a marble tomb in the church’s transept.

Art Deco

Plaza del Mercado de Manatí
Built in 1925 by architect, Fidel Sevillano, Plaza del Mercado de Manatí is an example of Art Deco style.

See also

 List of Puerto Rican architects
 Henry Klumb
 Ponce Creole

References

 
Puerto Rican culture